The 1923 Chicago Cardinals season was their fourth in the league. The team failed to improve on their previous output of 8–3, losing four games. They finished sixth in the league.

Schedule
On November 25th against Racine, the Cardinals became the only team in NFL history to score 4 points in a game.

Standings

References

 Ziemba, Joe. When Football Was Football: The Chicago Cardinals and the Birth of the NFL. Triumph Books, 1999. .

Arizona Cardinals seasons
Chicago Cardinals
Chicago